is a railway station located in the city of Kani,  Gifu Prefecture,  Japan, operated by the private railway operator Meitetsu.

Lines

Station layout

Akechi Station has one ground-level side platform and one island platform connected to the station building by a level crossing. The station is unattended.

Platforms

Adjacent stations

History
It was renamed to its present name on April 1, 1982.

Surrounding area

See also
 List of Railway Stations in Japan

External links

  

Railway stations in Japan opened in 1920
Stations of Nagoya Railroad
Railway stations in Gifu Prefecture
Kani, Gifu